Production is the second studio album by French record producer and songwriter Mirwais, released on 20 April 2000 through Naïve in Europe.

Background
Mastering was done at The Exchange, London, by Simon Davey, except  "Disco Science", mastered by Nilesh Patel.

Release and Promotion

Music video
Several music videos were released for Production. "Disco Science"  was directed by French photographer/artist Stéphane Sednaoui in 1999 and released the same year.

The second video, for "Naïve Song", was directed by the photographer Jean Baptiste Mondino during 2000.

Stéphane Sednaoui directed another video for "I Can't Wait", which was released as the third single.

Mirwais Remixed
In 2008, Naive Records released Mirwais Remixed, a remix album which came included the original album, with all singles remixed by different artists. Remixers include Giorgio Moroder, Joey Negro, Dave Clark, Shakedown, Thin White Duke, Les Rythmes Digitales and Olav Basovsky.

The song "Disco Science" was used during a hare coursing scene in the film Snatch.

Critical reception
According to Metacritic, the album received "generally favorable reviews" with a score of 73/100, based on 11 reviews. NME reviewed the album positively, calling it "the sound of an old punk playing catch-up with dance music." Rob Sheffield, writing for Rolling Stone, concluded "Cerebral, meticulous and frivolous, Production is a disco-science celebration of pop trash that most electronica gurus would be too spiritually elevated to deliver. Mirwais' knack for song puts him in another league altogether." The A.V. Club was not as positive, stating "What could have been a huge breakthrough instead sounds staid, as if he were so used to rocking the house that he didn't want to risk rocking the boat."

Track listing
Credits adapted from the liner notes of Production.

Notes
"Disco Science" contains a sample of "Cannonball" by The Breeders, written by Kim Deal.
"V.I. (The Last Words She Said Before Leaving)" is an adaptation and a sample of "Cargo Culte" written, composed, and performed by Serge Gainsbourg. Adapted by Mirwais Ahmadzaï.
"Junkie's Prayer" contains samples from an original soundtrack of the short film Louange (1995) by Jean-Paul Allègre.
"Miss You" is a cover originally by The Rolling Stones, written by Mick Jagger and Keith Richards. The song also contains a sample of Mirwais' "Disco Science".
"Paradise (Not for Me)" contains uncredited feature from Madonna. The song later appears on Madonna's eighth studio album Music (2001).
"Miss You" contains uncredited vocal feature from Craig Wedren.

Personnel
Personnel adapted from the liner notes of Production.

Mirwais Ahmadzaï – writer, composer, production, programming, mixing, keyboards, guitars, bass, vocals
Madonna – production, lead vocals 
Craig Wedren – production, lead vocals 
Mark "Spike" Stent – vocal recording, mixing  
Ian Robertson – recording assistance, mixing assistance  
Bruno Mercère – recording strings  
Bertrand Joncoux – mixing assistance   
Cyril Morin – strings arrangement, conductor 
Doubleté – scratches 
Nilesh Patel – mastering 
Simon Davey – mastering 
Stéphane Sednaoui – photography
Martin Verdet – artwork
Philippe Lakits – artwork

References

External links
 

2000 albums
Electronic albums by French artists